Messager des sciences historiques, published in Ghent from 1839 to 1896, was the most important Belgian history journal of the 19th century. Most of the contents related to the history of the medieval Low Countries. The initial editorial team was made up of Jules de Saint-Genois, Constant-Philippe Serrure, Philip Blommaert, Auguste Voisin and Auguste Van Lokeren, with some involvement from Frédéric de Reiffenberg and Antoine Schayes.

References

External links
Scans from the Getty Research Institute at Internet Archive: 1839, 1840, 1841, 1842, 1843, 1844, 1845, 1846, 1847, 1848, 1849, 1850, 1851, 1852, 1853, 1854, 1855, 1856, 1857, 1858, 1859, 1860, 1861, 1862, 1863, 1864, 1865, 1866, 1867, 1868, 1869, 1870, 1871, 1872, 1873, 1874, 1875, 1876, 1877, 1878, 1879, 1880, 1881, 1882, 1883, 1884, 1885, 1886, 1887, 1888, 1889, 1890, 1891, 1892, 1893, 1894, 1895, 1896, 

Publications established in 1839
Publications disestablished in 1896
1839 establishments in Belgium
1896 disestablishments in Belgium
History journals
Historiography of Belgium
Defunct journals